Al and Zoot is an album by the Al Cohn Quintet featuring Zoot Sims recorded in 1957 for the Coral label.

Reception

The AllMusic review by Scott Yanow states, "The mid- to late '50s were a period of intense recording activity and this album is one of the underrated gems that was somewhat overlooked at the time".

Track listing
All compositions by Al Cohn except as indicated
 "It's a Wonderful World" (Harold Adamson, Jan Savitt, Johnny Watson) - 6:32
 "Brandy and Beer" - 3:49
 "Two Funky People" - 4:30
 "Chasing the Blues" - 6:12
 "Halley's Comet" - 4:10
 "You're a Lucky Guy" (Saul Chaplin, Sammy Cahn) - 3:39
 "The Wailing Boat" - 6:18
 "Just You, Just Me" (Jesse Greer, Raymond Klages) - 5:33
 "Gone with the Wind" (Herbert Magidson, Allie Wrubel) - 6:17 Bonus track on CD reissue

Personnel 
Al Cohn - tenor saxophone
Zoot Sims - tenor saxophone, clarinet on 3
Mose Allison - piano
Teddy Kotick - bass
Nick Stabulas - drums

References 

1957 albums
Coral Records albums
Al Cohn albums
Zoot Sims albums